Edgar Zodaig Friedenberg (March 18, 1921 – June 1, 2000) was an American scholar of education and gender studies best known for The Vanishing Adolescent (1959) and Coming of Age in America (1965). The latter was a finalist for the 1966 National Book Award for Nonfiction.

Early life 

Edgar Z. Friedenberg was born in New York City on March 18, 1921, and was raised in Shreveport, Louisiana. He studied chemistry at the small, local Centenary College of Louisiana and earned a master's degree in the subject from Stanford University. World War II paused his studies, as Friedenberg served in the Navy and returned to finish his doctorate in education at the University of Chicago in 1946. He became a scholar of education and gender studies.

Career 

From the 1940s into the 60s, Friedenberg taught in Brooklyn College, the University of California, Davis, and the State University of New York, Buffalo. He wrote for Commentary during the tenure of Norman Podhoretz and reviewed books for The New York Review of Books and Ramparts.

His 1959 The Vanishing Adolescent was reprinted ten times and translated into multiple languages. His Coming of Age in America was a finalist for the 1966 National Book Award for Nonfiction. He has been included among the "radical romantics" sociologists of education in the 1960s counterculture.

Friedenberg left the United States for Canada in 1970 to protest the Vietnam War, where he became active in the Canadian Civil Liberties Association and taught at Dalhousie University for the rest of his life. He died June 1, 2000, in Halifax, Nova Scotia.

Selected bibliography 

 1959: The Vanishing Adolescent
 1965: Coming of Age in America
 1965: The Dignity of Youth and Other Atavisms
 1973: R. D. Laing
 1975: The Disposal of Liberty and Other Industrial Wastes
 1978: "Education for Passivity in Branch-Plant Society"
 1980: Deference to Authority: The Case of Canada

References

Further reading

External links 

 Finding Aid for the Edgar Zodiag Friedenberg Papers, 1935–1976 at the State University of New York at Buffalo University Archives

1921 births
2000 deaths
Writers from New York City
University of Chicago alumni
Academic staff of the Dalhousie University
American sociologists
University at Buffalo faculty
Brooklyn College faculty
United States Navy personnel of World War II